Martin Ralph (born 18 January 1960) is an Australian sprint canoeist who competed in the mid-1980s.

Career

At the 1984 Summer Olympics in Los Angeles, he was eliminated in the repechages of the K-2 500 m event. Subsequently, he began to coach with the VIS (Victorian Institute of Sport) and independently. Martin received the Australian Sports Medal from the Prime Minister and the Governor General for sporting achievement in the year 2000. Often asked if he won a gold medal Martin replies, "I didn't come first and I didn't come last but I got a real good look at the bloke who did!"

As a publicity stunt Martin busked in the City of Melbourne to raise sporting funds to represent Australia. Within 10 days of street performing "the hat was full" and Martin was on his way to the World Championships. Little did he know that this was to lead to a new career. In 1987 he retired from competition and started working full-time in the contemporary comedy rooms of Melbourne and Sydney alongside his coaching role with the Victorian Institute of Sport.

Since 1987, he worked as a comedian, master of ceremonies and motivational speaker expanding his work to develop quirky, unique stand-up comedy based around things that spin. He performed cowboy style spinning rope routines, unicycle feats and amazing yoyo routines, using traditional yoyos, high tech yoyos and even the manipulation of a yoyo that was not attached to the string.

During the 1990s and beyond, Martin spent years developing and building his own unique props including two of the largest spinning tops in the world. The largest spinning top was nearly one meter high, powered up to a speed of 2200 rpm using an electric drill, with over 60 small led globes installed in the top to emit a dazzling light display. A prolific inventor, Martin designed and built a gyroscope that self propels along a string set up to run safely through or over the audience.

Based in Riddells Creek, Martin has created a private museum featuring the greatest number of unique and collectable yoyos and spinning tops in Australia.

References
Sports-Reference.com profile

1960 births
Australian male canoeists
Canoeists at the 1984 Summer Olympics
Living people
Olympic canoeists of Australia
Australian male comedians
20th-century Australian people